Capuchin Convent Battery, also known as Kalkara Battery, was an artillery battery in Kalkara, Malta, built by Maltese insurgents during the French blockade of 1798–1800. It was part of a chain of batteries, redoubts and entrenchments encircling the French positions in Marsamxett and the Grand Harbour.

Capuchin Convent Battery was built overlooking Kalkara Creek. The battery was located adjacent to a Capuchin convent which had been built between 1736 and 1743. The convent sheltered it from bombardment from the nearby Cottonera Lines and the Post of Castile. It was medium-sized, and it blocked a country lane which led towards the creek. Its armament is not known.

The battery was possibly built by Alexander Ball. Construction started in January 1799, and was completed within a month.

Like the other French blockade fortifications, the battery was dismantled, possibly sometime after 1814. No traces of the battery can be seen today, but the convent still exists, although it has been modified.

References

Batteries in Malta
Kalkara
Military installations established in 1799
Demolished buildings and structures in Malta
French occupation of Malta
Vernacular architecture in Malta
Limestone buildings in Malta
1799 establishments in Malta